Syarhey Kurhanski (born 15 May 1986) is a Belarusian professional football player currently playing for Neman Grodno.

External links

1986 births
Living people
Belarusian footballers
Association football goalkeepers
FC Neman Grodno players
FC Savit Mogilev players
FC Partizan Minsk players
FC Belshina Bobruisk players
FC Dynamo Brest players
FC Dnepr Mogilev players
FC Slonim-2017 players
FC Lida players